Patrick Joseph Almond (born 13 December 2002) is an English professional  footballer who currently plays as a central defender for both Shildon AFC and Darlington on dual registration.

Professional career

Sunderland AFC 
Almond is a product of Sunderland's Academy system having been there since the age of 11 and was a regular starter in the Under-23 team during the 2020–21 season. He signed his first Professional Contract in the summer of 2021, which was incorrectly reported as an extension to a previous Contract.

He was an unused first-team substitute for two EFL Trophy games against Fleetwood Town and Lincoln City in the 2020–21 season after impressing for the Under-23s. He gained his senior professional debut in the same competition on 13 October 2021, in a 2–1 win over Manchester United U-23s after also being an unused substitute against Lincoln City the week before, again in the EFL Trophy.

Blyth Spartans (loan) 
On 14 January 2022, Almond joined National League North side Blyth Spartans on loan for the remainder of the 2021–22 season. He made his League debut for Blyth Spartans during the win against Alfreton Town on 22 January 2022.  Almond went on to score his first senior goal against Southport FC in a League fixture on the 22 February 2022. 

Almond went on to be an every present in the Blyth Spartans team for the remainder of the 2021-22 season, making 24 senior appearances in total, including the Northumberland Senior Cup win against Newcastle United U23’s at St James’ Park on 5 May 2022. Almond returned to Sunderland AFC at the end of his loan spell but was released at the end of the 2021-22 season in June 2022.

Return to football 
After being involved in a car accident in June 2022, Almond returned to football in November 2022 playing for Shildon in the Northern Premier League Division One East, making his debut against Grimsby Borough.

On 13 December 2022, Almond was signed on dual registration by Darlington as defensive cover during the remainder of the 2022–23 season. He went on to make his debut as a substitute in the FA Trophy win against Spennymoor Town on 20 December. During an FA Trophy match at Southend United on 14 January 2023, Almond suffered a suspected concussion and was taken to hospital locally, where he was diagnosed with a bleed on the brain and transferred to a London hospital for specialist treatment.

After spending nearly 3 weeks in hospital Almond was discharged to start his recovery at home, with his football career in the balance,  but remained hopeful and positive that a return was possible.

Career statistics

References 

2002 births
Living people
English footballers
Sunderland A.F.C. players
Blyth Spartans A.F.C. players
Shildon A.F.C. players
Darlington F.C. players
National League (English football) players
Association football defenders